Minal Rohit is an Indian scientist and systems engineer with the Indian Space Research Organisation (ISRO). She helped send the Mangalyaan space probe to Mars.

After graduating from Nirma Institute of Technology, Rohit joined the ISRO. She worked with mechanical engineers on the team of MOM. She monitored systems and the methane sensors involved with the spacecraft. She became part of the team that launched MOM as a system integration engineer .

Early life and education
Minal Sampat was born in Rajkot, India.

As a child, Rohit dreamt of becoming a doctor, but a space show on the TV changed her mind in class 8. During her education, she noticed that her female peers aimed for scientific careers based on their possible salaries rather than the pursuit of knowledge. Although she ended up getting a full education along with college, many girls around her only received partial education. She graduated from Gujarat University in 1999, along with graduating from Space Applications Centre with a B Tech in communications and was a gold medalist in electronics and communication engineering from Nirma Institute of Technology and Science, Ahmedabad.

Career 
Rohit started her career as a Satellite Communications engineer at Indian Space Research Organisation (ISRO) and went on to work for the Space Application Center. She was one of 500 scientists and engineers who worked on the Mars Orbiter Mission. As Systems Engineer for the mission, she helped integrate and test the sensors that the orbiter was carrying. She abstained from taking any leaves for two years.

Rohit was a head engineer and a Project Manager for upcoming projects such as Chandrayaan II. Sampat is currently Deputy Project Director at ISRO. She aims to become the first woman director to head a national space agency.

Research contributions 
Rohit was one of 500 scientists working on the Mangalyaan mission headed by the ISRO, and one of the 10 women assigned to the project. She served as project manager as well as systems engineer and was involved with incorporating the components of the methane sensor (MSM), Lyman-Alpha Photometer (LAP), Thermal Infrared Imaging Spectrometer (TIS), and Mars Color Camera (MCC) onto the orbiter. She is a senior engineer at the ISRO.

She is currently involved with the Chandrayaan-II, the follow up mission to the Chandrayaan-1, India's first successful Lunar probe. Her primary work on the project involves improving the Insat-3DS satellite to increase atmospheric data and quality received.

Legacy 
Minal Rohit was one of ten women out of 500 scientists to bring India to Mars. She helped India become the first country to orbit Mars with a satellite on the first attempt.

Rohit was featured in a short film Snapshots from Afar where she discussed her contribution to the Mangalyaan space probe to Mars.

Awards and accomplishments 
Rohit won the Young Scientist Merit Award from the ISRO in 2007 for her contributions to their Telemedicine program and the ISRO Team Excellence Award in 2013 for her work on INSAT 3D meteorological payloads. Regarding the MOM project, Rohit and her colleges were praised in a speech from Prime Minister Manmohan Singh over their work on the mission with the 15 month time constraint. She graduated Gujarat University with a gold medal in electronic and communication engineering.

She received the ISRO Young Scientist Merit Award 2013 for her contribution to the Telemedicine programme. Sampat was named one of CNN's 2014 Women of the Year.

Personal life 
Rohit has one son.

References

External links
 
 https://www.shethepeople.tv/home-top-video/chandrayaan-2-minal-rohit-scientist-systems-engineer

Women scientists from West Bengal
Living people
Date of birth missing (living people)
Indian Space Research Organisation people
Scientists from Kolkata
Gujarat University alumni
Indian space scientists
Engineers from West Bengal
21st-century Indian engineers
Indian women engineers
21st-century women engineers
Space systems engineers
Indian systems scientists
Engineers from Gujarat
Women scientists from Gujarat
21st-century Indian women scientists
Year of birth missing (living people)
Women planetary scientists
Planetary scientists